Beiimaan Love is a 2016 Indian Hindi-language thriller film directed and produced by Rajeev Chaudhari. It stars Sunny Leone and Rajneesh Duggal and marks the acting debut of Daniel Weber and Ziesha Nancy.

The film was released on 14 October 2016 to negative reviews.

Plot

Sunaina announces at their company stage programme that Daniel is the man behind her success. At the programme reception area, businessman father and son Raj meet Sunaina and walk out of the area. At home, Raj's father sits in anger and tells his son to let him be alone. Son-in-law Naresh tells Raj that he is the cause for the business loss their father is facing now. Raj now goes to Sunaina's house angry where security men try to stop Raj. Sunaina tells him she still loves Raj. Raj says that now its late and leaves the house. Sunaina watches Raj leaving. Scene shifts back to a night pub. Sunaina comes to attend her friend Natasha's birthday party. Raj, who is fully drunk tries to embrace Sunaina, who refuses hum, but Raj tries to hug Sunaina again. Now Sunaina slaps Raj on his face. Raj, who is full of anger tells Naresh that he will take revenge and wants to find out what about that girl. Finally, Sunaina is seen coming out of the office by Raj, who now realizes that she is working in their company. Now Raj bets Naresh he will be his slave if he cannot act as lover and then later betray Sunaina. Raj acts like a changed man and hard working for the company in front of Sunaina. Finally, Sunaina falls in love with Raj. The day comes where Raj lies with Sunaina in his house and Raj father finds out their love and tries to arrange for their marriage. Raj wanted to cheat Sunaina, but as his father and grandmother are now ready for their marriage, Raj agrees for marriage. On the marriage day, Sunaina's mother is found out by Raj father's friend as a prostitute, Raj father tells him to stop the marriage, now Raj confesses he wanted to reject her after acting as a lover. Hearing this, Sunaina becomes very angry and leaves with her mother away from the marriage area. Her mother commits suicide. Sunaina, now fully sad gets support from Daniel. Sunaina becomes a successful businesswoman shown as getting a Canadian company business deal overcoming Raj's father's business deal with the company. Raj's father tries to arrange a marriage between Raj and his business cum alcohol drinking friend's daughter. But after a party Raj finds the daughter to be a senseless and shameless lady trying to have body contact dance with another guy. Finally, Raj realises Sunaina was a good girl and comes back to Sunaina's house and again start love with Sunaina. Here, Sunaina acts as loving, but finally one day Sunaina tells him she hates him. Last scene, Raj is shown mad sitting on the roadside. Now Sunaina comes in a big car, sees Raj sitting mad become sad but after thinking of the past marriage day, Raj's confession and her mother's suicide, Sunaina closes her car and moves on.

Cast

Sunny Leone as Sunaina Verma
Rajneesh Duggal as Raj Malhotra
 Daniel Weber
 Ziesha Nancy

Release 
Beiimaan Love released on 14 October 2016. The film was not promoted by Sunny and her husband Daniel Weber and Chaudhari claims that it was because he refused to chop off her intimate scenes in the film. "The duo is going through a psychological fear and box-office phobia. Sunny's previous outings have not fared well. After seeing the rough cut, they wanted me to chop off intimate scenes between the actress and Rajneesh. Daniel claimed that he had contributed his bit by revamping Sunny's films on the editing table. But I did not like his interference and requested them to avoid doing so. I think they got upset with my decision," Chaudhari told Mid-Day.

Critical reception 
Times of India rated the film 2 stars and said, "If you are hankering for a Sunny Leone performance this weekend hop on to Baby Doll on Youtube and call it a day." and for Leone's performance, "Sunny Leone gets A for effort, because her struggle to rise up the content is evident" Filmfare rated the film 2 stars and said "There are two good things about the film, one's Sunny Leone and the other is the film's music. Rest of the movie is jaded, overtly sentimental." IBTimes rated the film 2 stars with appreciating Leone's performance and said, "Watch this Sunny Leone movie if your love for yourself is beiimaan." BollywoodLife rated the film 1 star and said, "Sunny Leone gives her best shot to keep this bad piece of cinema together and the film is not worth your time" Hindustan Times gave 0 stars to the film and said, "Beiimaan Love is a master-class in anger management. You sit through it and the world will be at your feet."
 India.com rated the film 2 stars and said, "It is silly to watch a Sunny Leone film and expect the seductress to act in it! Well, she can fake a thing or two (no, we are not hinting at her colorful portfolio). But you have to be honest with yourself as indeed with the faith of the filmmakers who cast Sunny in their movies." The Indian Express said, "This is a cringe-fest from start to finish. Stay away. And wave bye bye to Sunny: when a film sinks this low, it’s hard to climb back up again." Box Office India said,"While the film has the gusto to hold the plot together, it fails on implementation. It lacks punch and is mediocre fare." Reporter Times rated the film 2.5 stars and said, "The film had featured a great set of comic scenes and connects to target audience very well. But it’s not a film for every type of audience, you can watch the movie for time-pass but don’t expect much from it. Sunny is not yet complete actress for bollywood films but she is improving very well. Overall it's the best film by Sunny Leone so far."

Soundtrack

Awards and nominations

References

External links 
 
 
 
 

2010s Hindi-language films
Films scored by Amjad Nadeem
Films scored by Asad Khan
2016 thriller drama films
Films scored by Raghav Sachar
Films scored by Ankit Tiwari
Films scored by Manj Musik
Films scored by Sanjeev Darshan
Films scored by Chirantan Bhatt
Indian thriller drama films
Films shot in Dubai